Below is a list of destinations served by the carriers under the banner of US Airways Express: Air Wisconsin, Mesa Airlines, Piedmont Airlines, PSA Airlines, Republic Airlines, and Trans States Airlines.

North America

United States
Alabama
Birmingham - Birmingham-Shuttlesworth International Airport
Huntsville/Decatur - Huntsville International Airport
Mobile/Pascagoula, Mississippi - Mobile Regional Airport
Montgomery - Montgomery Regional Airport
Arizona
Flagstaff/Grand Canyon - Flagstaff Pulliam Airport
Phoenix - Phoenix Sky Harbor International Airport Hub
Tucson - Tucson International Airport
Yuma - Yuma International Airport
Arkansas
Fayetteville/Bentonville - Northwest Arkansas Regional Airport
Little Rock - Clinton National Airport
California
Bakersfield - Meadows Field Airport
Burbank - Bob Hope Airport
Fresno - Fresno Yosemite International Airport
Los Angeles - Los Angeles International Airport
Long Beach - Long Beach Municipal Airport
Monterey - Monterey Regional Airport
Oakland - Oakland International Airport
Palm Springs - Palm Springs International Airport
San Luis Obispo - San Luis Obispo County Regional Airport
Santa Ana - John Wayne Airport
Santa Barbara - Santa Barbara Airport
Colorado
Durango - Durango-La Plata County Airport
Grand Junction - Grand Junction Regional Airport
Connecticut
Hartford - Bradley International Airport
New Haven - Tweed New Haven Airport
Florida
Daytona Beach - Daytona Beach International Airport
Fort Walton Beach - Northwest Florida Regional Airport
Gainesville - Gainesville Regional Airport
Jacksonville - Jacksonville International Airport
Melbourne - Melbourne International Airport
Key West - Key West International Airport
Orlando - Orlando International Airport
Pensacola - Pensacola Regional Airport
Sarasota/Brandenton - Sarasota-Bradenton International Airport
Tallahassee - Tallahassee Regional Airport
Georgia
Atlanta - Hartsfield-Jackson Atlanta International Airport
Augusta - Augusta Regional Airport
Savannah - Savannah/Hilton Head International Airport
Illinois
Chicago - O'Hare International Airport
Indiana
Evansville - Evansville Regional Airport
Fort Wayne - Fort Wayne International Airport
Indianapolis - Indianapolis International Airport
Iowa
Des Moines - Des Moines International Airport
Kentucky
Cincinnati - Cincinnati/Northern Kentucky International Airport
Lexington/Frankfort - Blue Grass Airport
Louisville - Louisville International Airport
Louisiana
New Orleans - Louis Armstrong New Orleans International Airport
Baton Rouge - Baton Rouge Metropolitan Airport
Maine
Augusta - Augusta State Airport
Bangor - Bangor International Airport
Bar Harbor - Hancock County-Bar Harbor Airport
Portland - Portland International Jetport
Presque Isle - Northern Maine Regional Airport
Maryland
Baltimore - Baltimore-Washington International Thurgood Marshall Airport
Salisbury/Ocean City - Salisbury-Ocean City Wicomico Regional Airport
Massachusetts
Boston - Logan International Airport
Nantucket - Nantucket Memorial Airport
Michigan
Detroit - Detroit Metropolitan Wayne County Airport
Minnesota
Minneapolis/St. Paul - Minneapolis/Saint Paul International Airport
Mississippi
Gulfport/Biloxi - Gulfport-Biloxi International Airport
Jackson - Jackson International Airport
Missouri
Kansas City - Kansas City International Airport
St. Louis - Lambert-St. Louis International Airport
Nevada
Las Vegas - McCarran International Airport
Reno - Reno-Tahoe International Airport
New Hampshire
Manchester - Manchester-Boston Regional Airport
New Jersey
Newark - Newark Liberty International Airport
New Mexico
Albuquerque - Albuquerque International Sunport
Farmington - Four Corners Regional Airport
New York
Albany - Albany International Airport
Binghamton - Greater Binghamton Airport
Buffalo - Buffalo Niagara International Airport
Elmira - Elmira-Corning Regional Airport
Ithaca - Ithaca Tompkins Regional Airport
Islip - Long Island MacArthur Airport
Newburgh - Stewart International Airport
New York City - LaGuardia Airport
New York City - John F. Kennedy International Airport
Rochester - Greater Rochester International Airport
Syracuse - Syracuse Hancock International Airport
White Plains - Westchester County Airport
North Carolina
Asheville - Asheville Regional Airport
Charlotte - Charlotte/Douglas International Airport Hub
Fayetteville - Fayetteville Regional Airport
Greensboro/High Point/Winston-Salem - Piedmont Triad International Airport
Greenville - Pitt-Greenville Airport
Jacksonville - Albert J. Ellis Airport
New Bern - Coastal Carolina Regional Airport
Raleigh/Durham - Raleigh-Durham International Airport
Wilmington - Wilmington International Airport
Ohio
Akron/Canton - Akron-Canton Regional Airport
Cleveland - Cleveland Hopkins International Airport
Columbus - Port Columbus International Airport
Dayton - Dayton International Airport
Oklahoma
Oklahoma City - Will Rogers World Airport 
Tulsa - Tulsa International Airport 
Pennsylvania
Allentown - Lehigh Valley International Airport
Erie - Erie International Airport
Harrisburg - Harrisburg International Airport
Philadelphia - Philadelphia International Airport Hub
Pittsburgh - Pittsburgh International Airport
Scranton/Wilkes-Barre - Wilkes-Barre/Scranton International Airport
State College - University Park Airport
Williamsport - Williamsport Regional Airport
Rhode Island
Providence - T.F. Green Airport
South Carolina
Charleston - Charleston International Airport
Columbia - Columbia Metropolitan Airport
Florence - Florence Regional Airport
Greenville/Spartanburg - Greenville-Spartanburg International Airport
Hilton Head - Hilton Head Airport
Myrtle Beach - Myrtle Beach International Airport
Tennessee
Bristol/Kingsport/Johnson City - Tri-Cities Regional Airport
Chattanooga - Chattanooga Metropolitan Airport
Knoxville - McGhee Tyson Airport
Memphis - Memphis International Airport
Nashville - Nashville International Airport
Texas
Austin - Austin-Bergstrom International Airport
Dallas/Fort Worth - Dallas/Fort Worth International Airport
El Paso - El Paso International Airport
Houston - George Bush Intercontinental Airport
San Antonio - San Antonio International Airport
Utah
Salt Lake City - Salt Lake City International Airport
Vermont
Burlington - Burlington International Airport
Virginia
Arlington - Ronald Reagan Washington National Airport Hub
Charlottesville - Charlottesville-Albemarle Airport
Herndon - Washington Dulles International Airport
Lynchburg - Lynchburg Regional Airport
Newport News/Williamsburg - Newport News/Williamsburg International Airport
Norfolk - Norfolk International Airport
Richmond - Richmond International Airport
Roanoke - Roanoke Regional Airport
West Virginia
Charleston - Yeager Airport
Huntington/Ashland/Ironton - Tri-State Airport
Parkersburg - Mid-Ohio Valley Regional Airport
Wisconsin
Milwaukee - General Mitchell International Airport

Canada
Calgary - Calgary International Airport
Edmonton - Edmonton International Airport
Halifax - Halifax Stanfield International Airport
Montréal - Montréal-Pierre Elliott Trudeau International Airport
Ottawa - Ottawa Macdonald–Cartier International Airport
Quebec City - Québec City Jean Lesage International Airport
Toronto - Toronto Pearson International Airport
Vancouver - Vancouver International Airport

Mexico
Sonora
Hermosillo - Ignacio L. Pesqueira International Airport

Caribbean
Bahamas
Freeport - Freeport International Airport

References

External links
 US Airways destinations

Lists of airline destinations
US Airways Group